The Beautiful City ( /Shahr-e Ziba/) is a 2004 Iranian drama film directed by Asghar Farhadi.

Plot
Akbar celebrates his 18th birthday in the detention centre. He has been held in a rehabilitation centre for committing murder at the age of sixteen when he was condemned to death. Legally speaking, he had to reach the age of eighteen so that the conviction could be carried out. Now, Akbar is transferred to prison to await the day of his execution. A'la, a friend of Akbar, who himself has undergone imprisonment for burglary, soon after his release tries desperately to gain the consent of Akbar's plaintiff so as to stop the execution.

Cast
 Taraneh Alidoosti as Firoozeh
 Faramarz Gharibian as Abolqasem Rahmati
 Babak Ansari as A'la
 Hossein Farzi-Zadeh as Akbar
 Ahu Kheradmand as Mr. Abolqasem's Wife

Awards and nominations

References

External links
 
Variety | A Review of The Beautiful City 

2004 films
Iranian drama films
2000s Persian-language films
Films directed by Asghar Farhadi